Ishaan Music College is a university college affiliated to Indira Kala Sangeet Vishwavidyalaya, a Chhattisgarh-based public university recognized by the University Grants Commission.

Subjects taught 
 Vocal
 Kathak
 Drums
 Tabla
 Congo
 Art Appreciation
 Harmonium
 Guitar
 Keyboard
 Dholak
 Western Dance
 Zumba
 Yoga

References

Universities and colleges in Chhattisgarh
Music education in India
Vocational education in India
Music schools in India